Landgravine Anna Sophia of Hesse-Darmstadt (17 December 1638 – 13 December 1683) was a German noblewoman who reigned as Princess-Abbess of Quedlinburg under the name Anna Sophia II.

Early life 

Anna Sophia was the daughter of George II, Landgrave of Hesse-Darmstadt, and Duchess Sophia Eleonore of Saxony. She was raised as Lutheran, received good education and grew up to be strictly religious.

As writer 

In 1655, at the age of 17, Anna Sophia entered the Quedlinburg Abbey. In 1658, Anna Sophia published a book of spiritual meditations called Der treue Seelenfreund Christus Jesus. At first, Lutheran theologians regarded her book as suspect. They argued that the book equalized women with men, but it was later approved. Anna Sophia justified her work as was standard in the 17th century, saying that it was God's order. Being an abbess and Lutheran at the same time, Anna Sophia defended her choice to remain unmarried in her book. Her hymn Rede, liebster Jesu, rede was translated as Speak, O Lord, Thy Servant Heareth.

As nun and abbess 

Anna Sophia had a lapse of faith after her sister, Landgravine Elisabeth Amalie of Hesse-Darmstadt, converted to Roman Catholicism. She thought of leaving Quedlinburg to follow her sister's example, but ultimately changed her mind.

Despite suffering from "chronic cough", Anna Sophia was elected to succeed Anna Sophia I, Princess-Abbess of Quedlinburg, in 1681. The new princess-abbess selected Duchess Anna Dorothea of Saxe-Weimar as her coadjutor in 1683. Anna Sophia II died the same year, after only two years of reign, and was succeeded by Anna Dorothea.

References

Ancestry 

Abbesses of Quedlinburg
Lutheran abbesses
17th-century German women writers
House of Hesse-Darmstadt
1638 births
1683 deaths
Landgravines of Hesse-Darmstadt
Daughters of monarchs